Uraiyur (also spelt Woraiyur) is a posh locality in  Tiruchirapalli city in Tamil Nadu, India. Uraiyur was the ancient name of Tiruchirappalli City. Now, it became the one of the busiest area in Trichy City. It was the capital of the early Cholas, who were one of the three main kingdoms of the ancient Tamil country.  Sometimes spelt as Urayur, this location is also known as Thirukkozhi, Nikalaapuri, Uranthai, and Kozhiyur or Koliyur. It has a history dating back to before 300 BCE There is definite mention of the Cholas, and their capital in Ashokan inscriptions in Orissa pushing back the antiquity of the Cholas as well as Uraiyur to 272–232 BCE, which was the period of Ashoka (ca. 304–232 BCE) who was ruler of the Maurya Dynasty of Pataliputra (modern Patna).   Inscriptions and rock edicts of Ashoka and the Satavahanas describe Urayur as "the citadel and centre of the Cholas". Uraiyur was ruled by Karikala Cholan. A revered Digambar Jain Acharya, Samantabhadra, was born here in the later part of the second century CE. His notable works include Ratnakarandaka Shravakachara, Aaptamimamsa and Swambhu Stotra.

History

Uraiyur is also mentioned as the capital of the ancient great Chola King Karikalan before the 1st century CE until the dynasty was revived by Vijayalaya Chola c. 850 CE. The Cholas were one of the four great Tamil dynasties; (Pallavas, Cheras and Pandyas are the other three) who ruled over the Tamil country in South India, the Konkan coast, Deccan Plateau and during the peak reached beyond the Narmada up to the Ganges  Damodar delta from early antiquity.

The word Urayur in Tamil literally means "the residence".  Urayur was an ancient Chola city with a fortress and city wall on the southern banks of the river Kaveri. The Imperial Cholas of the 9th century CE and later made Tanjavur their capital, and Urayur slowly lost its place in the Chola administration.

Temples
Several notable temples are situated here:
Panchavarnaswamy Temple
Sri Azhagiya Manavala Perumal Temple
Vekkali Amman Temple
Thanthoneeswarar Temple

Notes

References
Nilakanta Sastri, K.A. (1935). The CōĻas, University of Madras, Madras (Reprinted 1984).

Medieval India
Chola dynasty
Former capital cities in India
Neighbourhoods and suburbs of Tiruchirappalli